In the field of user interfaces, an endocentric environment refers to a virtual reality or some other immersive environment which is introduced directly into the user's senses (for example by using VR goggles).

Systems which display a virtual reality indirectly to the user (for example by placing the viewer in a room made up entirely of rear projection screens) do not qualify.

See also
 Exocentric environment

Virtual reality